Charles Pacôme (5 November 1902 – 1 October 1978), born in Bergues, Nord, was a French olympic champion in Freestyle wrestling.

Olympics
Pacôme competed at the 1932 Summer Olympics and won gold medal in Freestyle wrestling, and went on to receive a silver medal at 1928 Summer Olympics.

References

External links
 
 

1902 births
1978 deaths
People from Bergues
Olympic wrestlers of France
Wrestlers at the 1928 Summer Olympics
Wrestlers at the 1932 Summer Olympics
French male sport wrestlers
Olympic gold medalists for France
Olympic silver medalists for France
Olympic medalists in wrestling
Medalists at the 1932 Summer Olympics
Medalists at the 1928 Summer Olympics
Sportspeople from Nord (French department)
20th-century French people